Regulator of CO Metabolism (RcoM) is a heme-containing transcription factor found in bacteria that senses carbon monoxide (CO). In the presence of carbon monoxide, this protein upregulates expression of genes involved in carbon monoxide oxidation or carbon monoxide stress response. RcoM is functionally related to another heme-containing transcription factor, CooA, but RcoM shares no structural relationship with CooA. RcoM is composed of an N-terminal Per-Arnt-Sim (PAS) domain and a C-terminal LytTR domain. The PAS domain binds a single molecule of heme and the LytTR domain binds to DNA upstream of carbon monoxide oxidation genes. The RcoM homolog from Paraburkholderia xenovorans is known to be dimeric and binds heme using a histidine and a methionine ligand in the Fe(II) oxidation state. Carbon monoxide replaces the methionine ligand and binds directly to the heme to active RcoM for DNA binding. Relative to other heme-containing proteins, RcoM has an extraordinarily high CO affinity, with a Kd < 100 pM, allowing this protein to sense very low levels of carbon monoxide.

References 

Prokaryote genes
Carbon monoxide
Heme enzymes
Transcription factors